John Christian Till (May 18, 1762 – November 19, 1844) was one of the first American composers. He joined the Bethleham Moravian Congregation as an organist in 1813.

References

1762 births
1844 deaths
American male composers
American composers